The Gate of Athena Archegetis is situated west side of the Roman Agora, in Athens and considered to be the second most prominent remain in the site after the Tower of the Winds.

Constructed in 11 BCE by donations from Julius Caesar and Augustus, the gate was made of an architrave standing on four Doric columns and a base, all of Pentelic marble. A dedicatory inscription offers an insight into the time and circumstances of the monument's construction: 
O ΔΗΜOΣ ΑΠO ΤΩΝ ΔOΘΕΙΣΩΝ ΔΩΡΕΩΝ ΥΠO ΓΑΙOΥ ΙOΥΛΙOΥ ΚΑΙΣΑΡOΣ ΘΕOΥ/ 
ΚΑΙ ΑΥΤOΚΡΑΤOΡOΣ ΘΕOΥ ΥΙOΥ ΣΕΒΑΣΤOΥ/  
ΑΘΗΝΑ ΑΡΧΗΓΕΤΙΔΙ ΣΤΡΑΤΗΓOΥΝΤOΣ ΕΠΙ ΤOΥΣ OΠΛΙΤΑΣ ΕΥΚΛΕOΥΣ ΜΑΡΑΘΩΝΙOΥ/ 
ΤOΥ ΚΑΙ ΔΙΑΔΕΞΑΜΕΝOΥ ΤΗΝ ΕΠΙΜΕΛΕΙΑΝ ΥΠΕΡ ΤOΥ ΠΑΤΡOΣ ΗΡΩΔOΥ ΤOΥ ΚΑΙ ΠΡΕΣΒΕΥΣΑΝΤOΣ/ 
ΕΠΙ ΑΡΧOΝΤOΣ ΝΙΚΙOΥ ΤOΥ ΣΑΡΑΠΙΩΝOΣ ΑΘΜOΝΕΩΣ (IG II3 4 12)
(The People of Athens from the donations offered by Gaius Julius Caesar the God
and the Reverend Emperor son of God
To Athena Archegetis, on behalf of the soldiers of Eukles from Marathon, 
who curated it on behalf of his father Herod and who was also an ambassador
under the archon Nicias, son of Sarapion, from the demos of Athmonon)
It was a monument dedicated by the Athenians to their patroness Athena Archegetis.

References

External links

 www.greece-athens.com

Landmarks in Athens
Roman Athens
Julius Caesar